The 2013–14 Cal State Northridge Matadors men's basketball team represented California State University, Northridge during the 2013–14 NCAA Division I men's basketball season. The Matadors, led by first year head coach Reggie Theus, played their home games at the Matadome as members of the Big West Conference. They finished the season 17–18, 7–9 in Big West play to finish in fifth place. They advanced to the championship game of the Big West Conference tournament where they lost to Cal Poly.

Season

Preseason
Former NBA star Reggie Theus was named the Matadors' fifth ever head coach on April 3, 2013, succeeding the fired Bobby Braswell. Theus coached the New Mexico State Aggies from 2005 to 2007, and was working as the head coach of the Los Angeles D-Fenders of the NBA Development League in 2012–13. Theus had a 41–23 record in two season with the Aggies, making one NCAA Tournament appearance in 2007.

Theus announced the team's complete schedule on August 21, 2013. The Matadors' schedule was highlighted by a trip to play USC, and also included road games at Fresno State and Stephen F. Austin, as well as home games against Southern Utah and Idaho. The Matadors also scheduled to play in the Central Michigan Tournament, hosted by Central Michigan University. Northridge's conference slate included one home game and one away game against each of the nine other members of the Big West Conference.

On November 1, the Matadors opened their season with an exhibition victory over Cal State Los Angeles, winning 82–67. Josh Greene led Cal State Northridge in scoring in the victory.

Roster

Schedule and results

|-
!colspan=9 style="background:#231F20; color:#CD1041;"| Exhibition

|-
!colspan=9 style="background:#231F20; color:#CD1041;"| Regular season

|-
!colspan=9 style="background:#231F20; color:#CD1041;"| Big West tournament

References

Cal State Northridge Matadors men's basketball seasons
Cal State Northridge